Fundora is a surname. Notable people with the surname include:

Iván Fundora (born 1976), Cuban wrestler
Lazaro Fundora (born 1994), Cuban volleyball player 
Melquíades Fundora (born 1926), Cuban charanga bandleader and flautist

Spanish-language surnames